Shinnok is a fictional character in the Mortal Kombat fighting game franchise by Midway Games and NetherRealm Studios. One of the franchise's primary villains, he debuted in the action-adventure spin-off Mortal Kombat Mythologies: Sub-Zero (1997) and made his first appearance in the main series with Mortal Kombat 4 the same year. He appears as both a playable character and the final boss of Mortal Kombat 4 and Mortal Kombat X (2015), assuming the identity of Corrupted Shinnok during his boss battle in the latter.

The series depicts Shinnok as the ruler of the Netherealm and a fallen Elder God who was banished by the thunder god Raiden for turning against his fellow deities. Aided by the power of a magical amulet, he attempts to conquer Earthrealm after escaping his banishment. He is assisted by other villainous characters in his conflict against Earthrealm, including the sorcerer Quan Chi. The reboot timeline of Mortal Kombat X also depicts fallen Earthrealm warriors being manipulated into serving Shinnok.

Reception towards the character has been mixed. While lauded as a villain, Shinnok's gameplay has been scrutinized for lacking the difficulty of the franchise's other final bosses.

Appearances

Mortal Kombat games
Shinnok is introduced in Ultimate Mortal Kombat 3 (1995), first in Noob Saibot's biography as an unnamed "evil and mysterious fallen Elder God" who is worshiped by a faction called the Brotherhood of the Shadow, then is identified by name in his ending. In Mileena's ending in Mortal Kombat Trilogy (1996), she is described as encountering Shinnok in the Netherealm after she is slain by Kitana.

Shinnok made his official debut as the non-playable final boss of Mortal Kombat Mythologies: Sub-Zero (1997), chronologically set prior to the events of the first Mortal Kombat game. His background was expanded therein as a disgraced Elder God forcibly expelled from the Heavens after committing crimes against his fellow deities. He yearned to rule Earthrealm (Earth) with immense power acquired by the creation of a magical amulet, but comes into direct conflict with Earthrealm's protector, the thunder god Raiden, who defeats Shinnok after centuries of warring that nearly destroys Earth, then strips him of the amulet and banishes him to the Netherealm. The scheming sorcerer Quan Chi assists Shinnok in defeating its ruler Lucifer in exchange for power and the opportunity to co-rule at Shinnok's side. Shinnok assembles a fanatical cult called the Brotherhood of the Shadow that is dedicated to worshipping him. Quan Chi hires Lin Kuei clansman Sub-Zero to find the lost amulet, a task he accomplishes, and Quan Chi presents the object to Shinnok, who is unaware that it was a meaningless duplicate while Quan Chi secretly kept the original for himself. Sub-Zero defeats Quan Chi and Shinnok in battle, sending them both into exile, then steals the (fake) amulet from Shinnok and returns it to Raiden at the game's conclusion.

Shinnok is the main (and immediately playable) boss character of Mortal Kombat 4 (1997), in which he invades and annexes the otherworldly realm of Edenia with the aid of Quan Chi's forces and the traitorous Edenian Tanya. He then declares war against the Elder Gods, specifically Raiden for his punishment, but his mission fails after he is defeated by perennial Mortal Kombat champion Liu Kang. He destroys Raiden in his noncanonical ending, is betrayed and killed with the amulet in Quan Chi's ending, and eliminates Reptile (described in his biography as "a general in Shinnok's army of darkness") in the latter's conclusion after taking offense at Reptile's demand that his race be restored as compensation for his service.

In Mortal Kombat: Armageddon (2006), in which Shinnok is selectable along with the then-entire series cast, he was not given an official biography but features in the game's Konquest mode as having been a friend of main protagonist Taven and his family for years. Taven is under the impression that Shinnok is still a force of good, as he rescues Shinnok from an attack by Li Mei and then helps him regain control of a spire from an army of demons that are later revealed to have been apparitions merely serving as a test. He makes a brief appearance in the beginning of the battle royal against the other combatants at the Pyramid of Argus in Armageddon's opening sequence when he summons a pair of giant skeletal hands that emerge from the earth and pin Raiden to the ground before Raiden hits him with a lightning blast. Shinnok actually survives the battle as he had sent a doppelgänger of himself to the pyramid and must face the being in battle after he defeats Blaze in his noncanonical ending. Despite his modest appearance in the game, it is revealed during Konquest mode that it was actually Shinnok who corrupted Taven and Daegon's quest by spreading the word to other fighters that Blaze's power was a gift, when he intended to lead them to total annihilation and claim the godlike power for himself, being the puppet master behind the Forces of Darkness.

Shinnok appears at the conclusion of the story mode of Mortal Kombat, the 2011 reboot of the first three titles. He is revealed therein to be the superior to Quan Chi, who informs him that their plan had "worked to perfection", namely spearheading the Netherealm's invasion of Earthrealm and Outworld, both of which had been greatly weakened over the course of Shao Kahn's invasion and defeat, combined with Quan Chi's machinations and Raiden's successful but flawed prevention of Armageddon.

In Mortal Kombat X (2015), his third selectable appearance and third overall in the Mortal Kombat series in which he serves as the final boss, Shinnok is first seen in flashback at Raiden's Sky Temple, fighting and defeating Raiden, Fujin, and a group of Earthrealm warriors in combat at the Jinsei Chamber, the source of Earthrealm's life force, until Raiden seals Shinnok inside his own amulet, whose whereabouts are then unknown over the course of the next twenty-five years, when Mileena has acquired it. The amulet switches hands thereafter until Quan Chi is beheaded by Scorpion after a fight at an Outworld refugee camp in Earthrealm, after which his severed head completes the incantation of a spell that frees Shinnok. With the aid of Quan Chi's revenants (all of which were Earthrealm warriors killed during the previous game's events), Shinnok and D'Vorah assault the Sky Temple, where Raiden is subdued and the climax is established when Shinnok enters the Jinsei and corrupts it, transforming himself into a massive and powerful demon ("Corrupted Shinnok"). A Special Forces unit led by Cassie Cage arrives to battle the transformed Shinnok and Quan Chi's revenant army. After Cassie is victorious over Shinnok, Raiden then purifies the Jinsei, stripping Shinnok of his powers. In a tag scene following the story mode's closing credits, Raiden, corrupted after absorbing the fallen Elder God's energy from the Jinsei, issues a threat to newly-appointed Netherealm rulers, Liu Kang and Kitana, should they endanger Earthrealm, stressing his stance by presenting them with Shinnok's disembodied but still-living head.

Shinnok returns in the prologue of Mortal Kombat 11 (2019), in which he is tortured and decapitated by Raiden after the events of MKX. His severed head is visited by new boss character Kronika, the Keeper of Time, who expresses sadness at his current state. The game's story mode reveals that Shinnok is actually Kronika's son, as well the brother of fellow Elder God Cetrion.

Character design and gameplay
Shinnok's likeness in Mortal Kombat 4 was based on that of series art director Steve Beran. His skin tone is ash-white like that of Quan Chi, his palette features strong red, yellow, and teal tones, and his head is covered with a mitral headdress. In Mortal Kombat Mythologies, Shinnok was portrayed in the cutscenes and gameplay by theater actor Gary Wingert, and similar to Shang Tsung in the original Mortal Kombat game, the character was designed as a wizened sorcerer with a floor-length green robe that concealed his lower body, while his offense in the game's final boss battle is exclusively magic-based as he hovered across the playfield. This was altered in MK4 to Shinnok wearing simple battle armor with the headdress but minus the robe, while he walked normally like the other characters.

He was first seen in the Mortal Kombat 4 attract mode standing with Quan Chi and toting a staff adorned with a replica of his amulet, but his assigned weapon in the game was instead a naginata-style spear, and the staff was not seen thereafter until it became his weapon in Mortal Kombat: Armageddon. Shinnok is able to mimic the special moves of his opponents, like Shang Tsung in the two-dimensional games, but the graphical limitations of Midway's then-new 3D software prevented him from physically transforming into the characters, and he was stripped of this feature altogether in the Game Boy Color port of the game, which was substituted by standard specials of a spear attack and dash punch. Mortal Kombat co-creator and programmer Ed Boon admitted he believed that Shinnok was not imposing enough as a final boss on account of the character having no special moves of his own, while lead storyteller John Vogel explained that Shinnok "wasn't as powerful as he should've been" in MK4 because of Quan Chi having given Shinnok the fake amulet, thus weakening him and enabling the Earth heroes to defeat him in the storyline. His Fatalities in MK4 and MKX involve the summoning of massive skeletal hands that kill his defeated opponents.

Shinnok is unlockable in Mortal Kombat X upon completion of the story mode. Like the game's other playable characters, his offense is split into three gameplay variations. He retains his ability of mimicry in "Impostor", which allows him to steal one of his opponent's special moves during battle, in addition to gaining an aerial teleport. "Bone Shaper" has Shinnok conjuring a scepter crafted from bone that he uses for combo attacks, and for "Necromancer", his signature skeletal hands are used as his primary weapon. Prima Games described him in the game as "a character that relies almost entirely on the attacks he gains from his variations."

Other media
Shinnok was planned to feature in one episode of the 1996 animated series Mortal Kombat: Defenders of the Realm in which he would seek to "avenge his past" against Raiden, but the episode was never produced.

Shinnok has a minor role in the 1997 film Mortal Kombat: Annihilation, in which he is played by German actor Reiner Schöne and his design and backstory differ from those seen in the games. He has a regular human appearance with neck-length blond hair while depicted in the script as the father of both Shao Kahn and Raiden, and is not identified by name on-screen until the film's conclusion. In the original closing scene that was shot but cut from the final print, he and Quan Chi are seen together in the Netherealm with Shinnok speaking the line, "Together, Quan Chi, we will be unstoppable."

He makes a one-panel appearance in a special-edition tie-in comic book included with the 1998 PC release of Mortal Kombat 4, in which he and his Netherealm denizens capture Edenia upon emerging from a portal created by an orb that Quan Chi (posing as a refugee from another realm) had given to Sindel.

Shinnok appears in the animated film Mortal Kombat Legends: Battle of the Realms, and is voiced by Robin Atkin Downes.

Reception
Shinnok was ranked 44th in UGO Networks' 2012 list of the top fifty Mortal Kombat characters. Robert Workman of GamePlayBook rated him seventh in his selection of the ten "Worst Mortal Kombat Characters Ever" in 2010. "The most threatening this guy gets is when he summons giant hands to squeeze someone to death." Den of Geek ranked Shinnok 35th in their 2015 rating of the series' 73 playable characters, critical of how he was built up "as this Satanic ender of worlds" in Ultimate Mortal Kombat 3, but was "just a lazy Shang Tsung" in MK4, while "it wasn’t until Armageddon and Mortal Kombat 9 that they were able to make him seem like an actual threat," and further adding that in MKX, he "was pretty fun as a hybrid of Emperor Palpatine and Loki." Hardcore Gaming 101 called him "one of the lamest final bosses in the series" and said, "He can steal the moves from other characters and summon skeleton hands, but that's more or less it, which is pretty lame for a guy who overthrew Lucifer." Mikel Reparaz of GamesRadar described the character as "a pale old man in a stupid hat." Complex chose Shinnok as the second-most underrated MK character behind Kenshi in 2011, calling him an "uber-evil version of Merlin," and ranked him sixth in their 2013 selection of the twenty "most brutal" series characters, for his "cunning and deviousness" and being "arguably as heartless as Shao Kahn." Dom Nero of Esquire, in 2019, described Shinnok in MKX as a "malignant [and] terrible shithead."

In 2015, Liam Martin of Digital Spy rated Shinnok's "Hell Hands" second behind Quan Chi's "Leg Beatdown" as his favorite MK4 Fatality. Den of Geek described Corrupted Shinnok's Fatality in MKX, in which he summons two winged demons to impale his opponent on a spiked column, then drags the corpse downward across the spikes before the demons then feast on the remains, as "certainly something special."

Eric Snider of Film.com remarked in his review of Mortal Kombat: Annihilation, "We find out that [Raiden] and Shao Kahn are actually brothers, and that their father, the evil Shinnok ... is one of the Elder Gods. This must have been the 'Luke, I am your father' moment of the Mortal Kombat series."

References

Action film characters
Action film villains
Deity characters in video games
Fictional gods
Fictional mass murderers
Fictional nihilists
Fictional polearm and spearfighters
Male characters in video games
Male film villains
Male video game villains
Mortal Kombat characters
Video game antagonists
Video game bosses
Video game characters introduced in 1997
Video game characters who can teleport